Hyposoter is a large cosmopolitan genus of parasitoid wasps belonging to the family Ichneumonidae.

The genus has cosmopolitan distribution.

Selected species

 Hyposoter affinis (Cresson, 1864)
 Hyposoter albicans (Brischke, 1880)
 Hyposoter didymator (Thunberg, 1822)
 Hyposoter dimidiatus (Ashmead, 1894)
 Hyposoter discedens (Schmiedeknecht, 1909)
 Hyposoter disippi (Viereck, 1925)
 Hyposoter distriangulum Chen, Huang & Hsu, 2017
 Hyposoter dolosus (Gravenhorst, 1829)
 Hyposoter ebeninus (Gravenhorst, 1829)
 Hyposoter ebenitor Aubert, 1972
 Hyposoter erythrinus (Viereck, 1925)
 Hyposoter exiguae (Viereck, 1912)
 Hyposoter fitchii (Bridgman, 1881)
 Hyposoter formosanus (Uchida, 1932)
 Hyposoter forticarinatus (Cameron, 1906)
 Hyposoter frigidus (Lundbeck, 1897)
 Hyposoter fugitivus (Say, 1835)
 Hyposoter fuscitarsus (Viereck, 1925)
 Hyposoter galvestonensis (Viereck, 1906)
 Hyposoter grahami (Viereck, 1925)
 Hyposoter himalayensis (Cameron, 1906)
 Hyposoter horticola (Gravenhorst, 1829)
 Hyposoter inareolator Aubert, 1971
 Hyposoter indicus (Cameron, 1899)
 Hyposoter inquinatus (Holmgren, 1860)
 Hyposoter jachontovi (Meyer, 1927)
 Hyposoter juanianus (Roman, 1920)
 Hyposoter leucomerus (Thomson, 1887)
 Hyposoter longulus (Thomson, 1887)
 Hyposoter luctus (Davis, 1898)
 Hyposoter lymantriae Cushman, 1927
 Hyposoter maculatus (Hedwig, 1938)
 Hyposoter masoni Torgersen, 1985
 Hyposoter meridionalis (Smits van Burgst, 1914)
 Hyposoter nefastus (Cresson, 1874)
 Hyposoter neglectus (Holmgren, 1860)
 Hyposoter niger (Brulle, 1846)
 Hyposoter nigrior Aubert, 1993
 Hyposoter nigritarsis (Kriechbaumer, 1894)
 Hyposoter nigritus (Holmgren, 1860)
 Hyposoter nigrolineatus (Viereck, 1912)
 Hyposoter nigromaculatus (Strobl, 1904)
 Hyposoter noctuae (Ashmead, 1890)
 Hyposoter notatus (Gravenhorst, 1829)
 Hyposoter obliquus (Seyrig, 1935)
 Hyposoter obscurellus (Holmgren, 1860)
 Hyposoter occidentalis (Viereck, 1925)
 Hyposoter orbator (Gravenhorst, 1829)
 Hyposoter pallidirostris (Schmiedeknecht, 1909)
 Hyposoter pallipes (Smits van Burgst, 1912)
 Hyposoter parorgyiae (Viereck, 1910)
 Hyposoter pectinatus (Thomson, 1887)
 Hyposoter placidus (Desvignes, 1856)
 Hyposoter planatus (Viereck, 1925)
 Hyposoter plesius (Viereck, 1925)
 Hyposoter popofensis (Ashmead, 1902)
 Hyposoter porteri Brethes, 1913
 Hyposoter postcaedator Aubert, 1964
 Hyposoter posticae (Sonan, 1929)
 Hyposoter praecaedator Aubert, 1963
 Hyposoter prinzi (Meyer, 1926)
 Hyposoter prolixus (Holmgren, 1860)
 Hyposoter raoi Gupta, 1987
 Hyposoter rapacitor Aubert, 1971
 Hyposoter reunionis (Benoit, 1957)
 Hyposoter rhodocerae (Rondani, 1877)
 Hyposoter rivalis (Cresson, 1872)
 Hyposoter romani Ozols, 1959
 Hyposoter rubiginosus Cushman, 1924
 Hyposoter rubraniger (Lopez Cristobal, 1947)
 Hyposoter ruficrus (Thomson, 1887)
 Hyposoter rufiventris (Perez, 1895)
 Hyposoter rufovariatus (Schmiedeknecht, 1909)
 Hyposoter sanguinator Aubert, 1960
 Hyposoter seniculus (Gravenhorst, 1829)
 Hyposoter sicarius (Gravenhorst, 1829)
 Hyposoter simlaensis (Cameron, 1905)
 Hyposoter singularis (Schmiedeknecht, 1909)
 Hyposoter synchlorae (Ashmead, 1898)
 Hyposoter taihorinensis (Uchida, 1932)
 Hyposoter takagii (Matsumura, 1926)
 Hyposoter tenuicosta (Thomson, 1887)
 Hyposoter thuringiacus (Schmiedeknecht, 1909)
 Hyposoter tianshuiensis Sheng, 2004
 Hyposoter tibialis (Hedwig, 1938)
 Hyposoter tricolor (Ratzeburg, 1844)
 Hyposoter tricoloripes (Viereck, 1911)
 Hyposoter validus (Pfankuch, 1921)
 Hyposoter ventralis (Walker, 1874)
 Hyposoter vierecki Townes, Momoi & Townes, 1965
 Hyposoter virginalis (Gravenhorst, 1829)
 Hyposoter vividus (Holmgren, 1860)
 Hyposoter volens (Cameron, 1899)
 Hyposoter xanthocerus (Viereck, 1921)

References

Ichneumonidae
Ichneumonidae genera